Dorsum Higazy is a wrinkle ridge at  in Mare Imbrium on the Moon. It is 63 km long and was named after Egyptian geologist Riad Higazy in 1976.

References

Ridges on the Moon
Mare Imbrium